Deane Alexander Williams (born 23 September 1996) is a British professional basketball player who currently plays for Telekom Baskets Bonn of the Basketball Bundesliga. He played college basketball for Augusta University where he was named the Peach Belt Co-Player of the Year and Defensive Player of the Year in 2019. In 2021, he was named the Úrvalsdeild Foreign Player of the Year.

College career
Williams played college basketball for Augusta University from 2015 to 2019. He left the school eleventh on its all-time scoring list and finished in the top five in schools history in blocks and rebounds.

Club career
In the summer of 2019, Williams signed with Úrvalsdeild karla club Keflavík.  During his first season, he averaged 15.6 points and 9.9 rebounds before the final game of the regular season and playoffs were canceled due to the 2020 coronavirus pandemic in Iceland. In April 2020, he re-signed with Keflavík. Following the season he was named the Úrvalsdeild Foreign Player of the Year.

In July 2021, Williams signed with  LNB Pro B club Saint-Quentin.

On June 28, 2022, Williams signed with Telekom Baskets Bonn of the German Basketball Bundesliga

National team career
Williams played for the Great Britain national U-20 team in 2016.

References

External links
Profile at Eurobasket.com
Profile Proballers.com
Icelandic statistics at Icelandic Basketball Association
Augusta Jaguars bio

1996 births
Living people
Augusta Jaguars men's basketball players
British expatriate basketball people in Iceland
British expatriate basketball people in the United States
British men's basketball players
Small forwards
Sportspeople from Bath, Somerset
Deane Williams
Telekom Baskets Bonn players
Deane Williams